Polonodon is an extinct genus of dromatheriid cynodonts that lived in what is now Poland during the Carnian stage of the Late Triassic. It includes one species, Polonodon woznikiensis, which is known only from isolated teeth.

References

Prehistoric prozostrodonts
Prehistoric cynodont genera
Carnian genera
Late Triassic synapsids of Europe
Fossils of Poland
Fossil taxa described in 2018